Zealandia Bank, also known as Farallon de Torres or Piedras de Torres in Spanish, or Papaungan in Chamorro, consists of two rocky pinnacles about 1.5 kilometers apart, in the Northern Mariana Islands in the Pacific Ocean. Zealandia Bank is one of 18 units within the Mariana Arc of Fire National Wildlife Refuge, (a.k.a. Volcanic Unit) of the Marianas Trench Marine National Monument.

Geology
Zealandia Bank is the exposed portion of the peak of an eroded underwater volcano. In 2004, a survey by NOAA discovered active fumaroles, including possible volcanic activity.

The volcano has erupted most recently rhyodacite but previously built up as an andesitic volcano that was dormant long enough for a carbonate platform to grow on its summit.

Name
Zealandia Bank was named in 1858 after the British barque Zealandia. The area is part of the United States Commonwealth of the Northern Mariana Islands.

References

External links 
 Zealandia Bank. Pascal Horst Lehne and Christoph Gäbler: Über die Marianen. Lehne-Verlag, Wohldorf in Germany 1972.
 Sharks at Zealandia Bank
 
.

Former German colonies
Islands of the Northern Mariana Islands
Stacks (geology)
Volcanoes of the Northern Mariana Islands
Stratovolcanoes of the United States
Uninhabited islands of the Northern Mariana Islands